Thomas Ray Wilson (born 4 March 1946) is a retired United States Navy vice admiral. He previously served as Director of the Defense Intelligence Agency from July 1999 to July 2002.

Overview
Vice Admiral Thomas R. Wilson, USN was the 13th Director of the Defense Intelligence Agency. Other flag rank assignments included Director of Intelligence (J2), The Joint Staff; Associate Director of Central Intelligence for Military Support, Central Intelligence Agency; Vice Director of Intelligence, The Joint Staff; and Director of Intelligence, United States Atlantic Command. Following retirement from the Navy in 2002, he served in several senior executive roles for Alliant Techsystems, Inc. (ATK): President of ATK Missile Systems, Corporate Senior Vice President and President of ATK Precision Systems Group, and ATK Senior Vice President for Tidewater Operations, retiring from ATK in 2009.

Vice Admiral Wilson and his wife, Ann, have three sons: Jeffrey, Gregory, and Matthew.

Early life
Thomas Ray Wilson was born on 4 March 1946 in Columbus, Ohio, and raised in the small community of Groveport, Ohio. As a youth he spent much time working on family farms, acquiring a lifelong interest in agriculture and rural life in America. He graduated from Groveport Madison High School in 1964, where he was active in sports, band, and other school activities as well as the Boy Scouts of America and the Groveport Methodist Church.

Education and training
Wilson entered Ohio State University in 1964, and in 1968 graduated with a Bachelor of Science in agriculture with concentrations in agricultural economics and rural sociology. He entered Navy Officer Candidate School in Newport, RI, in October 1968 and was commissioned an Ensign, U.S. Naval Reserve in March 1969. Wilson was a distinguished graduate of the Defense Intelligence College in 1975, and was a member of the Defense Intelligence College class that participated in the pilot program leading to the college being able to grant a Master of Science in Strategic Intelligence Degree. Other Military training included Communications Officer Ashore Course at Newport, RI in 1969; Targeting and mission planning at Nuclear Weapons Training Group Atlantic, in Norfolk, VA in 1980; and Flag and General Officer CAPSTONE Training in 1995. In 1978, while stationed in Keflavik, Iceland, he earned an M.A. in management and human relations from Webster University.

Awards, decorations and badges
Admiral Wilson has received the Defense Distinguished Service Medal (three awards), Navy Distinguished Service Medal, Defense Superior Service Medal, Legion of Merit (two awards), Meritorious Service Medal (two awards), Joint Service Commendation Medal (two awards), and Navy Commendation Medal (two awards), the National Defense Service Medal with Bronze Star, Global War on Terrorism Service Medal, Navy Sea Service Deployment Ribbon (four awards), and Navy Overseas Service Ribbon (four awards).

Unit awards include the Joint Meritorious Unit Award with Oak Leaf Cluster and Navy Meritorious Unit Commendation with two Bronze Stars.

Authorized badges include the Atlantic Command Badge, The Joint Staff Identification Badge, and the Defense Intelligence Agency Badge.

Vice Admiral Wilson has received the following awards from foreign countries: Republic of China (Taiwan) Service Ribbon, Czech Republic Order of the White Lion, and the Royal Norwegian Order of Merit.

Vice Admiral Wilson is also the recipient of the National Intelligence Distinguished Service Medal, the Central Intelligence Agency Director’s Award, and the Defense Intelligence Agency Director's Award.  In 2001 he received the NAACP’S Meritorious Service Award for his leadership of DIA's nationally recognized Diversity and Equal Opportunity programs.

References

Sources
 DD Form 214 (Wilson, Thomas R )
 U.S. Navy Flag Officer Personnel Files
 U.S. Navy Orders

External links
 http://www.gpo.gov/fdsys/pkg/CREC-1999-04-15/html/CREC-1999-04-15-pt1-PgS3820-9.htm 
 http://www.dia.mil/history/directors/vadm-wilson.html 
 https://web.archive.org/web/20070613001231/https://www.cia.gov/news-information/press-releases-statements/press-release-archive-1997-1/pr103197.html
 https://fas.org/irp/congress/2002_hr/031902wilson.pdf 
 http://avalon.law.yale.edu/21st_century/t_0032.asp 
 http://www.historycommons.org/entity.jsp?entity=thomas_wilson 
 

Living people
1946 births
Directors of the Defense Intelligence Agency
People from Columbus, Ohio
People from Groveport, Ohio
Recipients of the Defense Distinguished Service Medal
Recipients of the Defense Superior Service Medal
Recipients of the Legion of Merit
Recipients of the National Intelligence Distinguished Service Medal
Recipients of the Navy Distinguished Service Medal